Herbstmilch (English: Autumn Milk) is the German autobiography of a previously unknown peasant woman, Anna Wimschneider (1919–1993), published in 1985, written in simple, everyday language. Although it is the autobiography of an unknown, 'ordinary' person, the book became a huge bestseller and remained in the bestseller charts for three years.

The title derives from the Bavarian word for a type of fermented milk, from which soup is made.

Story

Wimschneider tells of the hard conditions in which she grew up, on a farm. In 1927, at the age of 8, after her mother's death, she had to look after her family of 9. She later married Albert Wimschneider, but he was then conscripted and went off to war, leaving Anna to look after their farm, together with her mother-in-law.

Film
The book was made into a film in 1988 by Joseph Vilsmaier.

References

1985 German novels
German autobiographical novels
German novels adapted into films